Isabella Veneranda-Patricia Cramp (born December 18, 2004), who originally performed as Isabella Cramp, shifted to Isabella Crovetti-Cramp, and now performs as Isabella Crovetti, is an American actress and voice actress.

Career
Cramp began her acting career at age five, when she started playing small roles on television and in commercials. She has acted in several television series since then, most notably her role as Abby Weaver in ABC's sitcom, The Neighbors (2012–2014). She voices Shine in the Nick Jr. program, Shimmer and Shine, which premiered in August 2015. Cramp played young Joy in the 2015 film Joy.

Filmography

Television

Film

Awards and nominations

References

External links
 

2004 births
Living people
21st-century American actresses
American child actresses
American film actresses
American television actresses
Place of birth missing (living people)
American voice actresses